Broken Wing is an EP by American punk rock band Alkaline Trio, released on April 2, 2013 on Epitaph and Heart & Skull. Produced by both Bill Stevenson and Jason Livermore, Broken Wing was recorded during the same sessions that yielded the band's eighth studio album, My Shame Is True, and consists of songs that were written for the album but didn't fit the album's theme of catharsis.

Digital deluxe versions of My Shame Is True include all four songs from Broken Wing as bonus tracks.

Track listing

Personnel

Alkaline Trio
Matt Skiba – guitar, backing & lead vocals
Dan Andriano – bass, lead & backing vocals
Derek Grant – drums

Additional musicians
Bill Stevenson - backing vocals

Recording personnel
Bill Stevenson - producer, engineer
Jason Livermore - producer, engineer, mixing, mastering
Andrew Berlin - engineer
Chris Beeble - engineer

Artwork
Nick Pritchard - design
Monkeybird - album photography

References

2013 EPs
Alkaline Trio EPs
Epitaph Records EPs
Albums produced by Bill Stevenson (musician)